Qusheh Kand (also Romanized as Qūsheh Kand and Qowsheh Kand; also known as Ghoosheh Kand, Kushakand, and Qowjeh Kand) is a village in Khararud Rural District, in the Central District of Khodabandeh County, Zanjan Province, Iran. At the 2006 census, its population was 614, in 113 families.

References 

Populated places in Khodabandeh County